Medusa is the second solo studio album by Scottish singer Annie Lennox, released on 6 March 1995 by RCA Records. It consists entirely of cover songs. The album entered the UK Albums Chart at number 1 and peaked in the United States at number 11, spending 60 weeks on the Billboard 200. It has since achieved double platinum status in both the United Kingdom and the United States.

Background and release
The album yielded four singles in the United Kingdom: "No More I Love You's" (which entered the UK Singles Chart at number 2, becoming Lennox's highest-peaking solo single), "A Whiter Shade of Pale", "Waiting in Vain" and "Something So Right".

Lennox explains the origins of the album in the liner notes:

This album contains a selection of songs I have been drawn to for all kinds of reasons. There were not chosen with any particular theme or concept in mind—the method was more by instinct than by design. The work undertaken was truly a labour of love for me and I feel privileged to have been given this opportunity.

The album was nominated for Best Pop Album at the Grammy Awards of 1996, losing to Turbulent Indigo by Joni Mitchell. Lennox took home the Best Female Pop Vocal Performance award for her work on the first single "No More I Love You's".
This album was re-released in late 1995 in a double jewel case containing the album Medusa and a nine-track bonus CD featuring the studio version of Paul Simon's "Something So Right" (with Simon guesting on vocals and guitar) and eight tracks recorded live from the concert in Central Park: "Money Can't Buy It", "Legend in My Living Room", the Eurythmics singles "Who's That Girl?", "You Have Placed a Chill in My Heart" and "Here Comes the Rain Again", along with "Why", "Little Bird" and "Walking on Broken Glass".

Critical reception

Professional reviews for Medusa were mixed, ranging from favourable to outright hostile. AllMusic notes that critics "savaged" the album upon release: Trouser Press was probably the most severe in its criticism, characterising Lennox's interpretations of classic material as "obvious", "milquetoast" and "willfully wrongheaded". Reviewer Ira Robbins did single out the track "No More I Love You's" for genuine, if backhanded, praise: "The only song here that benefits from her ministrations is 'No More 'I Love You's,' a minor 1986 hit for Britain's otherwise forgotten The Lover Speaks, and that's only by dint of the original's obscurity."

Meanwhile, Rolling Stone gave the album a more favourable, though still mixed review:

Annie Lennox called her justifiably popular solo debut Diva, but it's actually on the follow-up effort Medusa that she really starts acting like one. This wildly uneven album of cover versions starts with perhaps its highest point—a truly wonderful interpretation of "No More I Love You's", a relatively obscure British hit by The Lover Speaks. Unfortunately, Lennox doesn't work the same magic with more familiar material like Al Green's "Take Me to the River" and Procol Harum's "A Whiter Shade of Pale".

Track listing

Personnel
Credits adapted from the liner notes of Medusa.

Musicians

 Annie Lennox – all vocals, keyboards, flute
 Stephen Lipson – programming, guitar, keyboards, bass
 Marius de Vries – keyboards, programming
 Luís Jardim – percussion, bass
 Peter-John Vettese, Andy Richards, Matthew Cooper – keyboards
 Tony Pastor – guitar
 Dann Gillen, Neil Conti – drums
 Doug Wimbish – bass
 Judd Lander, Mark Feltham – harmonica
 Pandit Dinesh – tablas
 Kirampal Singh – santoor
 James McNally – accordion
 Danny D, Steve Sidelnyk – additional programming
 Anne Dudley – orchestral, brass and string arrangement

Technical
 Stephen Lipson – production
 Heff Moraes – engineering, mixing
 Marius de Vries – pre-production

Artwork
 Laurence Stevens – sleeve design
 Bettina Rheims – photography

Live in Central Park

Although no tour was held to promote this album, Lennox played a one-off concert in Central Park in New York City on 9 September 1995. This was subsequently released on videotape as Annie Lennox in the Park and on DVD as Annie Lennox Live in Central Park.

Information
 Director: Joe Dyer
 Recorded: Live in Central Park Summerstage, New York City, 9 September 1995
 Release date: December 1995 (video); December 2000 (DVD)
 Label: BMG/Arista
 Runtime: 90 minutes

Track listing
 "Money Can't Buy It" (Lennox)
 "Legend in My Living Room" (Lennox, Vettese)
 "Walking on Broken Glass" (Lennox)
 "No More 'I Love You's" (Hughes, Freeman)
 "Who's That Girl?" (Lennox, Stewart)
 "You Have Placed a Chill in My Heart" (Lennox, Stewart)
 "Waiting in Vain" (Marley)
 "I Love You Like a Ball and Chain" (Lennox, Stewart)
 "Little Bird" (Lennox)
 "Sweet Dreams (Are Made of This)" (Lennox, Stewart)
 "Train in Vain" (Jones, Strummer)
 "Why" (Lennox)
Promotional video clips
  "No More 'I Love You's" (Hughes, Freeman)
 "A Whiter Shade of Pale" (Reid, Brooker, Fisher)
 "Waiting in Vain" (Marley)
 "Something So Right" (Simon)

Awards

Grammy Awards

|-
|  style="width:35px; text-align:center;" rowspan="2"|1996 ||  Medusa || Best Pop Vocal Album || 
|-
|"No More I Love You's" || Best Pop Vocal Performance – Female || 
|-

Charts

Weekly charts

Year-end charts

Certifications

}

}

References

1995 albums
Albums produced by Stephen Lipson
Annie Lennox albums
Arista Records albums
Covers albums
Electronica albums by Scottish artists
RCA Records albums